The Cuatro Ciénegas killifish (Lucania interioris; also known locally as the sardinilla de Cuatro Ciénegas) is a critically endangered species of fish in the family Cyprinodontidae. It is endemic to Cuatro Ciénegas in Mexico.

References

External links
 Information on the species at Zipcodezoo

interioris
Endemic fish of Mexico
Freshwater fish of Mexico
Cuatrociénegas Municipality
Natural history of Coahuila
Endangered fish
Critically endangered biota of Mexico
Critically endangered fauna of North America
Fish described in 1965
Taxonomy articles created by Polbot